Philip Radovic, D.P.M. (born 27 March 1958) is a professor and practicing podiatric surgeon in South Orange County California.

Early life and education
Radovic was raised on the move, mostly in northern California, but also spent several years in Ottawa Canada and Rio de Janeiro, Brazil. He graduated from the University of Colorado, Boulder with a degree in Molecular Cellular and Developmental Biology 1982. In 1978, during his undergraduate studies at the University of Colorado, Boulder, Radovic became a founding member of the Lake Eldora Handicapped Ski Program, where he trained several Special Olympic medalists. From 1978 until his graduation, Radovic volunteered at the People’s Clinic in Boulder, CO, and was a Mental Health counselor at the Boulder Psychiatric Institute before attending the California College of Podiatric Medicine where he received his Doctorate in 1987. His 4th Year Podiatric Medical Education was accomplished at County-USC Medical Center, Los Angeles.

Radovic traveled extensively throughout South America and trekked from Caracas, Venezuela to the Rio Orinoco, and along the Rio Negro and Amazon rivers. While crewing in the Caribbean, Radovic was called to use his medical training to treated his captain, who was suffering from acute cardiomyopathy induced dehydration. Eventually commandeering the vessel to Santiago de Cuba in 1989 where, after initial confrontation with the Cuban Navy, Radovic was allowed to enter and admit Captain Winding to the Cuban hospital where Winding recovered before setting sail across the Atlantic to Denmark for a heart transplant.

In 2007, Radovic was awarded a Diploma/Black Belt, Ruas Vale Tudo by Marco Ruas.

Career

After completing a two-year foot and ankle reconstructive surgical residency in 1989, Radovic opened his private practice in San Clemente, California. In 1996, Radovic founded and directed the Podiatric Medical and Surgical Residency Program at Aestheticare, also known as the Mission Hospital Regional Medical Center or SouthWestern Podiatric Medical and Surgical (PM&S-36). Eleven years later, Radovic incorporated California Foot & Ankle Associates. Today, Radovic continues to diagnose, treat, and prevent disorders of the foot and ankle at his boutique podiatric surgical practice in San Clemente.

In addition to building his private practices, and over twenty-five years of training surgical residents and sports medicine Fellows, Radovic practices medicine globally, as a volunteer. He served as a physician volunteer for both Liga International, a non-profit organization that provides free health care for those living in poverty in Mexico, and with Operation Footprint (formerly known as the Baja Crippled Children’s Project). Most recently, Dr. Radovic spent time as a volunteer with his two sons for earthquake relief in Nepal.

Radovic is founder of California Foot & Ankle Associates, a Podiatric Group specializing in the diagnosis, treatment, and prevention of disorders of the foot and ankle.

As a regular on-air medical consultant, Radovic provides expert medical advice on the nationally syndicated show, The Doctors.

Teaching

 Fellowship Director, American Academy of Podiatric Sports Medicine (AAPSM)
 Clinical Assistant Professor at Samuel Merritt University 
 Founder and Residency Director at the AesthetiCare/Mission Hospital Regional Medical Center (SouthWestern) Podiatric Medical and Surgical Residency Program 
 Adjunct Clinical Professor at the California College of Podiatric Medicine 
 Past Clinical/Surgical Instructor at Western Medical Centers Podiatric Surgical Residency Program 
 Adjunct Clinical Faculty at Barry University School of Podiatric Medicine. 
 Associate Professor, Podiatric Medicine, Midwestern University, College of Health Sciences, AZ.
 Associate Clinical Professor, Western University of Health Sciences, Pomona, CA.

Memberships

Radovic's Certifications and Memberships include: Diplomate, American Board of Foot and Ankle Surgery; Diplomate, American Board of Podiatric Orthopedics; Fellow, American Academy of Podiatric Sports Medicine; Member, The American Academy of Podiatric Sports Medicine.

Publications
 In 2003, Radovic co-authored “Revisiting Epinephrine in Foot Surgery,” a published study in the Journal of the American Podiatric Medical Association that discovered the benefits of using anesthetics containing epinephrine for foot surgery.
 In 2007, Radovic also co-authored a published study that discovered a new modification to the Youngswick procedure, a procedure for the correction of hallux limitus deformity. 
 As a Fellowship Director at SouthWestern Podiatric Sports medicine, Radovic reviewed “Bone Marrow Edema Lesions in the Professional Runner,” which was published in the American Journal of Sports Medicine in 2014.
 In 1989, Radovic co-authored, "Volume Injection Adhesiotomy," a published study in the Journal of the American Podiatric Medical Association which describes a novel way to treat painful post surgical and adhesions.
 In 1990, Radovic co-authored, "Tarsal Tunnel Syndrome, Comprehensive Review of 87 Cases," a published manuscript in the Journal of the American Podiatric Medical Association.
 In 1990, Radovic co-authored, "Use of the Subcutaneous Tissue Expander for Delayed Primary Closure of Flaps," a published manuscript in the Journal of Foot Surgery.
 In 2008, Radovic authored, "Nonsurgical Treatment for Hallux Abducto Valgus with Botulinum Toxin A," a published study in the Journal of the American Podiatric Medical Association which describes a novel method to treat painful hallux valgus (bunion) deformities with botulinum toxin.
 In 2020, Radovic authored, "Nonsurgical Treatment for Hallux Abducto Valgus with Botulinum Toxin A- An improvement of the Injection Paradigm," a published study in the Journal of American Podiatric Medical Association which describes a novel improvement to the treatment of painful hallux valgus (bunion) deformities with botulinum toxin.
 In 2020, Radovic authored, "Treatment of "plantar fasciitis"/Plantar Heel Pain Syndrome with botulinum toxin- A novel injection paradigm pilot study in the journal, The Foot, which describes a novel method of treatment for heel pain syndrome of different etiologies.

Research

Inventor/Innovator, Lead Instructor: AbobotulinumtoxinA in the Management of Hallux Valgus in Adult Patients: Results of a Randomized and Placebo-Controlled Phase 2 Trial, Dysport in Hallux Abducto Valgus (HAV) Phase IIa.

Patents
 Radovic, Phillip. 2020. Methods of Treating Abnormalities of the First metatarsophalangeal joint of the Foot. United States Patent 10,869,914, filed January 3, 2020, and issued December 22, 2020.
 Radovic, Phillip. 2020. Methods of Treating Pain Associated with Abnormalities of the First metatarsophalangeal joint of the Foot. United States Patent 10,525,112, filed November 1, 2018, and issued January 7, 2020.
 Radovic, Phillip. 2018. Methods of Treating Abnormalities of the First metatarsophalangeal joint of the Foot. United States Patent 10,159,723, filed March 9, 2018, and issued December 25, 2018.
 Radovic, Phillip. 2020. Functional Orthotic Support Structure for Footwear. United States Patent 10,667,574, filed July 1, 2019, issued June 2, 2020.
 Radovic, Phillip. 2020. Plantar Heel Pain Syndrome Treatment. United States Patent 10,561,715, filed November 27, 2018, and issued February 18, 2020.
 Radovic Phillip. 2007. Methods of Treating Abnormalities of the First metatarsophalangeal joint of the Foot. United States Patent 7,276,244, filed February 11, 2005, and issued October 2, 2007.

References

External links 
 List of University of Colorado Boulder alumni

1958 births
Living people
University of Colorado alumni
American surgeons